Noche Bohemia is an album by Mexican singer Chavela Vargas, credited on the album as "Chabela Vargas". It was released in 1961 on the Orfeón label. Vargas was accompanied on the recording by guitarist Antonio Bribiesca.  Noche Bohemia was the first of more than 80 records by Vargas. The album included "Macorina" which became one of Vargas' best known songs.

Track listing
Side A
	Simón Blanco (Arnaldo Ramirez)
	Macorina
	La China	
	Verde Luna	
	Quisera Amarte Menos	
	Pena Mulata	

Side B
	Aquél Amor (Agustín Lara) 
	Maringá	
	Negra María	
	No Te Importe Saber	
	Mi Segundo Amor	(Cuates Castilla)
	La Noche De Mi Mal (José Alfredo Jiménez)

References

1961 albums
Chavela Vargas albums